KBEW-FM (98.1 FM, "98 Country") is a radio station broadcasting a country music format. Licensed to Blue Earth, Minnesota, United States, the station is currently owned by Carolyn and Doyle Becker, through licensee Riverfront Broadcasting of Minnesota, Inc.

History
The station was assigned the call sign KQEI on January 17, 1992; it was changed to KBEW-FM on May 7, 1993. The station signed on later that year. Its country music programming was simulcast with KBEW until July 1994, when the AM side switched to oldies.

References

External links

Radio stations in Minnesota
Radio stations established in 1993
Country radio stations in the United States
1993 establishments in Minnesota